Giuseppe Fonzi (born 2 August 1991) is an Italian former professional racing cyclist, who rode professionally between 2014 and 2019 for the  and  teams. He was named in the start list for the 2017 Giro d'Italia, where he finished last of the 161 riders to complete the race.

Career
Fonzi competed in his first ever monument race at the 2016 Tour of Flanders, but did not finish the race; he had been riding as a domestique for teammate Filippo Pozzato. He finished 4th overall in the Tour of Taihu Lake. In 2017, Fonzi rode the Tour of Flanders again. At the Giro d'Italia, Fonzi finished 161st overall, last of the riders to complete the race. His best result of the season was 12th overall at the Tour de Korea.

At the 2018 Tour de Langkawi, Fonzi finished 5th overall, after finishing 10th in the breakaway that stayed away on stage 7. He started the Giro d'Italia for a second time in his career, and finished the race in last place once again.

Major results
2009
 1st Piccola Tre Valli Varesine

2016
 4th Overall Tour of Taihu Lake

2018
 5th Overall Tour de Langkawi

Grand Tour general classification results timeline

Monuments results timeline

References

External links
 

1991 births
Living people
Italian male cyclists
Sportspeople from Pescara
Cyclists from Abruzzo